Destruction Ritual is the second studio album by black metal band Krieg. It was recorded from 1999 to 2001. Duane "Cryptic Winter" Timlin did the drum work for the album. The guitar work was recorded at Vortex Sound Studio in New Jersey and drums & vocals at Studio One in Wisconsin. There was no bass played on this album.

Track listing

Personnel
Imperial – vocals, guitar
Cryptic Winter – drums

2002 albums
Krieg (band) albums